Asovka is a river in Perm Krai, Russia, a left tributary of the Barda. Its origin is located east of village Machino, near the border with Sverdlovsk Oblast. Main tributaries: Molyobka (right); Bolshaya Kumina, Sosnovka (left).

References 

Rivers of Perm Krai